Shareefa Faradah Cooper (born March 12, 1984), known professionally as Shareefa, is an American R&B singer. Shareefa has lived in Charlotte, North Carolina. She signed with Disturbing tha Peace/Def Jam Recordings in 2005. Her first single, "Need a Boss", featuring the rapper and labelmate Ludacris, was produced by Rodney "Darkchild" Jerkins, and reached #62 on the Billboard Hot 100. Her only album Point of No Return was released in October 2006 and charted at #25 on the Billboard 200.

Discography

Albums

Studio albums

Compilation albums

Mixtapes 
 The Misunderstanding Of Shareefa (2010)

Singles

As lead artist

Notes

External links
 Official Disturbing tha Peace Site
 Shareefa at MySpace

20th-century African-American women singers
American women singer-songwriters
American contemporary R&B singers
1984 births
Living people
Musicians from East Orange, New Jersey
Singer-songwriters from New Jersey
Musicians from Charlotte, North Carolina
21st-century American singers
21st-century American women singers
African-American songwriters
21st-century African-American women singers
Singer-songwriters from North Carolina